The Glenroy River is a tributary of the Matakitaki River in the north of the South Island of New Zealand. It is widely known as a short class 4 river (River difficulty classification system for rafting).

Rivers of the Tasman District
Rivers of New Zealand